Cystogomphus is a fungal genus in the family Gomphidiaceae. Circumscribed by American mycologist Rolf Singer in 1942, the genus is monotypic, containing the single species Cystogomphus humblotii, originally described from France.

References

External links
 

Boletales
Monotypic Boletales genera
Taxa named by Rolf Singer